Anushka Ranjan is an Indian actress and model. She has modeled for designers like Manish Malhotra, Vikram Phadnis, Neeta Lulla, Pria Kataris Puri, Babita Malkani, Amy Billimoria and many others. She was the Brand Ambassador a jewellery brand known as "Varuna D'Jani".

Early life and background
She was born in Mumbai to Shashi Ranjan, an actor/director from FTII and the Publisher of GR8 Magazine and Anu Ranjan, the Founder of The Indian Television Academy. Her younger sister is actress Akansha Ranjan Kapoor.

Anushka did her schooling from Jamnabai Narsee School and her 2 years acting diploma from Whistling Woods International and 1 year acting performing arts course at The ITA School of Performing Arts, followed by a 3 months course from Anupam Kher School of acting, followed by theater with Nadira Babbar. She has trained in Kathak dance under the supervision of Guruji Viru Krishna.

Personal life 
On 21 November 2021, Ranjan tied the knot with her longtime boyfriend actor Aditya Seal in Mumbai.

Philanthropy
Anushka acts as the spokesmodel for her mother Anu Ranjan's NGO, BETI.

Acting
She made her debut in Hindi Cinema with the Romantic Comedy, Wedding Pullav, in October 2015, directed by ace cinematographer Binod Pradhan. She had a friendly appearance in Batti Gul Meter Chalu starring Shahid Kapoor and directed by Shree Narayan Singh.

In 2020, she starred in AltBalaji's Fittrat as Amy opposite Krystle D'Souza and Aditya Seal.

Filmography

Films

Web series

Music videos

Awards and nominations

References

External links

Hindi cinema
Actresses in Hindi cinema
Indian film actresses
Year of birth missing (living people)
Living people
Indian female models